An absorption edge, absorption discontinuity or absorption limit is a sharp discontinuity in the absorption spectrum of a substance. These discontinuities occur at wavelengths where the energy of an absorbed photon corresponds to an electronic transition or ionization potential. When the quantum energy of the incident radiation becomes smaller than the work required to eject an electron from one or other quantum states in the constituent absorbing atom, the incident radiation ceases to be absorbed by that state. For example, incident radiation on an atom of a wavelength that has a corresponding energy just below the binding energy of the K-shell electron in that atom cannot eject the K-shell electron.

Siegbahn notation is used for notating absorption edges.

In compound semiconductors, the bonding between atoms of different species forms a set of dipoles. These dipoles can absorb energy from an electromagnetic field, achieving a maximum coupling to the radiation when the frequency of the radiation equals a vibrational mode of the dipole. When this happens, the absorption coefficient gets a peak yielding the fundamental edge. This occurs in the far infrared region of the spectrum.

See also
K-edge
Siegbahn notation

References

Electromagnetic radiation
Radiation